Great Piece Meadows is a  fresh water swamp located in the towns of Lincoln Park, Montville, and Fairfield in New Jersey.  The wooded swamp is mostly inside the bow of the Passaic River which floods during the year from heavy rain or heavy snow melt.

The meadows are part of the Northeastern coastal forests ecoregion.

See also
 Great Swamp National Wildlife Refuge

References

Landforms of Essex County, New Jersey
Landforms of Morris County, New Jersey
Passaic River
Swamps of New Jersey
Watchung Mountains
Meadows in the United States